TVR HD was a Romanian free-to-air high definition channel, owned by TVR, the Romanian state-owned broadcasting corporation. It broadcast programming of TVR1 and TVR2 in HD.

On 3 November 2019, the channel was closed down and was replaced by TVR1 HD and TVR2 HD.

References

External links
 Date tehnice pentru recepţia TVRHD (Romanian)

Defunct television channels in Romania
HD
Publicly funded broadcasters
Television channels and stations established in 2008
Television channels and stations disestablished in 2019